Gérard Veilleux, OC (born 1942) was president of the Canadian Broadcasting Corporation from 1989 to 1993. He became president of Power Communications in 1994. 

Born in East Broughton, Quebec, he received a Bachelor of Commerce degree in 1963 from Université Laval and a Master of Public Administration degree in 1968 from Carleton University.

Veilleux was a career public servant:

 Director General, Federal-Provincial Relations, Quebec Department of Intergovernmental Affairs, during October Crisis.
 Assistant Deputy Minister, Department of National Health and Welfare
 Assistant Deputy Minister, Federal-Provincial Relations and Social Policy, Department of Finance
 Associate Deputy Minister, Ministry of State for Economic Development
 Deputy Clerk of the Privy Council
 Secretary to the Cabinet for Federal-Provincial Relations
 Secretary of the Treasury Board

Memberships

 Institute for Research on Public Policy
 Board of Governors of McGill University
 National Gallery of Canada Foundation
 Chairperson of the Canada Millennium Scholarship Foundation

He is a winner of the Outstanding Achievement Award, the Public Service of Canada's highest honour. In 1995, he was made an Officer of the Order of Canada.

References
 Gérard Veilleux

1942 births
Living people
Presidents of the Canadian Broadcasting Corporation
20th-century Canadian civil servants
Officers of the Order of Canada
Université Laval alumni
Carleton University alumni